Flögel, also spelled Floegel, is a German surname. Notable people with the surname include:

 Rudi Flögel (born 1939), Austrian footballer
 Thomas Flögel (born 1971), Austrian footballer and manager, son of Rudi

German-language surnames